The 2008 Welsh Liberal Democrats leadership election took place in the autumn of 2008 following the resignation of Mike German. Two Assembly Members contested the leadership Jenny Randerson and Kirsty Williams.

Kirsty Williams won the contest with 59.8% of the vote and was declared leader on 8 December 2008, who became the first female party leader in Wales.

Election rules

The Welsh Liberal Democrats had reviewed their leadership rules during their 2007 Autumn Conference in Aberystwyth and during their 2008 Autumn Conference in Clydach.

To stand for leader candidates needed to be an elected member of The National Assembly for Wales and have the support of 10% of AMs (i.e. one other colleague).

Timeline 

Mike German became party leader in 2007 (having served as Assembly group leader since 1999) and indicated that he would stand down in 2008. Kirsty Williams announced in summer of 2008 that she would run, formally launching her campaign on 10 September. Mike German formally announced his resignation during the Welsh Liberal Democrats Autumn Conference in Clydach on 11 October 2008  and Jenny Randerson formally announced her candidature that afternoon and launched her campaign in early November.

The winner was announced at an event in the Wales Millennium Centre on 8 December 2008.

Candidates

Declined 
Peter Black
Mick Bates
Eleanor Burnham

Declared

Result 

Williams went on to serve as leader for seven and a half years until her resignation following the following the 2016 elections to the Welsh Assembly.

References

Welsh Liberal Democrats
Leaders of political parties in Wales
Political party leadership elections in Wales
Welsh Liberal Democrats leadership election